New Life may refer to:

Religion and politics
New life (Christianity)
New Life Church (disambiguation)
New Life Church (Colorado Springs, Colorado)
New Life Churches, New Zealand, Australasian Pentecostal Church denomination
New Life Christian Fellowship, Evangelical church in Blacksburg, Virginia
New Life Ranch, non-denominational Christian summer camp in Oklahoma
New Life phase of Meher Baba's spiritual life and teaching that begun in 1949
New Life Movement, civic education program initiated by Chiang Kai-shek
Operation New Life, care and processing of Vietnamese refugees in the closing days of the Vietnam War
New Life (party), Nove Zhyttya, a political party in Ukraine

Books and publications 
La Vita Nuova (The New Life), a book of verse by Dante Alighieri written around 1293
A New Life (novel), a 1961 novel by Bernard Malamud
The New Life (Pamuk novel), a 1995 novel by Orhan Pamuk
The New Life (Crewe novel), 2023 LGBTQ historical novel
New Life+: Young Again in Another World, a light novel series by MINE, with a manga adaptation by Satoru Abou
Novaya Zhizn (Mensheviks) ("New Life"), the 1917–1918 newspaper of Mensheviks
Novaya Zhizn ("New Life"), 1905-published newspaper of Bolsheviks

Film and television 
A New Life (film), a 1988 American romantic comedy film starring, written and directed by Alan Alda
New Life (film), a 2016 American romantic drama film starring, written and produced by Erin Bethea

TV and radio
New Life Network, international distributor of family friendly television programs
A New Life (Hong Kong TV series), a 1991 Hong Kong crime drama television series
A New Life (Singaporean TV series), a 2005 Singaporean television drama series
"A New Life" (The Outer Limits), a 2001 episode of the TV series The Outer Limits
"New Life" (Agents of S.H.I.E.L.D.), a 2019 episode of the TV series Agents of S.H.I.E.L.D.
New Life 91.9, radio station in Charlotte, North Carolina

Music 
The New Life, a psychedelic rock band who performed on the 1969 film The Sidehackers

Albums  
A New Life (album), a 1974 album by The Marshall Tucker Band
New Life (The Thad Jones/Mel Lewis Orchestra album), 1976
New Life (David Murray album), 1985
New Life, album by Mehrzad Marashi 2010
New Life (Monica album), 2012 
New Life (Antonio Sánchez album), 2013
The New Life (album), the second album by Northern Irish band Girls Names 2013

Songs 
"New Life" (song), the second UK single by Depeche Mode 1981
"A New Life", 1987 song by Pet Shop Boys
"New Life", song by Blind Melon from the Soup album
 A New Life, song from the musical Jekyll & Hyde by Frank Wildhorn

See also
New Life Church (disambiguation)